Stillorgan-Rathfarnham RFC is an Irish rugby team based in County Dublin. They play in the Leinster Metropolitan League. There are also teams playing at J4 and J5 standard. The club colours are maroon, white and navy and are sponsored by Ma Nolan's Bars in Nice France, PC Peripherals and The Dropping Well Bar and Restaurant in Milltown. In 2018 the club renamed from Stillorgan RFC to Stillorgan-Rathfarnham RFC as the club prepares to move into its new home at Tibradden Road, Rathfarnham. The development will include 3 playing pitches, floodlighting and a clubhouse. The grounds shall be known as Heavey Technology Park, to reflect the support and assistance provided by club member Michael Heavey throughout this process.

Club history
Stillorgan Rugby Club (formerly known as Salesians RFC) was founded and first registered with the Leinster Branch of rugby in 1973, when a group of former pupils from schools run by the Salesian fathers themselves playing together in Dublin. Most were a long way from home and had attended school in the Salesian colleges Pallaskenry, Limerick, Warranstown in Meath and Ballinakill in County Laois.

The application was made to the Leinster Branch, who had to be satisfied that the club had a home pitch, complete with dressing rooms and showers. After a bit of searching a pitch of sorts was found in Maynooth and the application was approved Salesians played their first season at J3 level in the '73 to '74 season with moderate success and were soon fielding two teams. The first team colours were red jerseys with black collars and cuffs and black shorts. The club strip was changed in 1978 to reflect the school colours of the new salesian college recently opened in Celbridge. Despite being over 35 years old, Stillorgan is still one of the youngest clubs in Dublin. Stillorgan suffered in the early eighties when many of its founding members retired and the club was forced to move its homeground to the Royal Hospital Kilmainham. In the 1986/1987 season the club moved to CUS Sports Grounds Bird Avenue and this has ensured the clubs growth and existence and today it fields 3 teams in the various leagues and cups. In recent times the firsts have won the Leinster J3 Section B Pennant and Leinster J3 League Title.

In 2018 the club renamed from Stillorgan RFC to Stillorgan-Rathfarnham RFC as the club prepares to move into its new home at Tibradden Road, Rathfarnham.

References

External links
 Club Website - http://www.stillorganrathfarnhamrfc.ie/ 

Irish rugby union teams
Rugby clubs established in 1973
Rugby union clubs in Dún Laoghaire–Rathdown